The 1955 Campeonato Paulista da Primeira Divisão, organized by the Federação Paulista de Futebol, was the 54th season of São Paulo's top professional football league. Santos won the title for the second time. no teams were relegated and the top scorer was Santos's Del Vecchio with 23 goals.

Championship
The championship was disputed in a double-round robin system, with the team with the most points winning the title.

Top Scores

References

Campeonato Paulista seasons
Paulista